Nizhneye Ustye is a rural locality (a village) in Kenozerskoye Rural Settlement of Plesetsky District, Arkhangelsk Oblast, Russia. The population was 501 as of 2010. There are 8 streets.

Geography 
Nizhneye Ustye is located on the Toksha River, 193 km southwest of Plesetsk (the district's administrative centre) by road. Presnetsovskaya is the nearest rural locality.

References 

Rural localities in Plesetsky District